John Morris Sheppard (May 28, 1875April 9, 1941) was a Democratic United States Congressman and United States Senator from Texas. He authored the Eighteenth Amendment (Prohibition) and introduced it in the Senate, and is referred to as "the father of national Prohibition."

Background
Sheppard was born in Morris County in east Texas, the oldest of seven children, to lawyer John Levi Sheppard, later a judge and United States Representative; and his wife, the former Margaret Alice Eddins.

Through his mother Margaret, Morris was a direct descendant of Robert Morris (1734–1806) of Philadelphia, Pennsylvania, a financier who had signed the Declaration of Independence, the Articles of Confederation, and the United States Constitution.

Education

Sheppard received his B.A. degree from the University of Texas at Austin in 1895, and an LL.B. from the University of Texas School of Law in 1897.  While in law school Sheppard became a member of the Methodist Church, and became friendly with two classmates, future Governor Pat Neff, and future U.S. Senator Tom Connally. In 1898, he received his LL.M. from Yale Law School.

He began practicing law with his father in Pittsburg, Texas and later Texarkana.

Public service

In 1902, Morris Sheppard was elected as a Democrat to replace his deceased father in the United States House of Representatives.  He held the seat until his resignation in 1913, when the Texas legislature elected him to the United States Senate. In 1914 and while holding the office of Senator, he was on the Central Committee of the First National Conference on Race Betterment, a conference on eugenics held at the Battle Creek Sanatorium. He served as Democratic whip between 1929 and 1933.

In the 1928 presidential election, Texas voters abandoned the Democratic candidate, Alfred E. Smith, Governor of New York and a Catholic, carrying the state for Republican Herbert Hoover and contributing to his victory. In the summer of 1929, First Lady Lou Hoover arranged the traditional teas for wives of congressmen, inviting Jessie De Priest, wife of Oscar Stanton De Priest of Chicago, the first African American elected to Congress in the 20th century. Senator Sheppard was among those who objected to this invitation, quoted as saying, "I regret the incident beyond measure. It is recognition of social equality between the white and black races and is fraught with infinite danger to our white civilization."

Sheppard held his Senate seat until his death in Washington, D.C. in 1941. Then-Representative Lyndon B. Johnson ran for Sheppard's Senate seat in the 1941 special election, and lost to Governor W. Lee O'Daniel.

Legislative agenda

As Senator, Sheppard sponsored progressive reform legislation promoting rural credit programs, child labor laws, and antitrust laws. He was also an advocate of women's suffrage in the United States. But he supported the maintenance in Texas and the South of racial segregation in public facilities and the disenfranchisement of blacks.

Prohibition

During his tenure, Sheppard was a vocal supporter of the temperance movement. He helped write the Webb–Kenyon Act (1913) to regulate the interstate shipment of alcoholic beverages, authored the Sheppard Bone-Dry Act (1916) to impose prohibition on the District of Columbia, introduced the Senate resolution for the Eighteenth Amendment establishing national prohibition, and helped write the Volstead Act which provided for its enforcement.

However, during the Prohibition era, a still that produced 130 gallons of moonshine per day was discovered on a Texas ranch that Sheppard owned.

When a resolution calling for a Twenty-first Amendment to repeal prohibition was introduced to the Senate by John J. Blaine, Sheppard filibustered it for eight-and-a-half hours. He was not helped by a single Dry Senator and he relented, the motion passing by 63 votes to 23.

Sheppard–Towner Maternity and Infancy Protection Act of 1921

Co-sponsored by Morris Sheppard and Horace Mann Towner, the Sheppard–Towner Act of 1921 provided Federal matching funds for services aimed to reduce maternal and infant mortality.  The funding included: midwife training; visiting nurses for pregnant women and new mothers; distribution of nutrition and hygiene information; health clinics, doctors and nurses, for pregnant women, mothers and children.

Federal Credit Union Act of 1934

Senator Morris Sheppard and Congressman Wright Patman are considered the fathers of the Federal Credit Union Act of 1934. Sheppard was the act's author.  The bill had stalled in the United States House of Representatives, considerably shortening the time the United States Senate had to pass the final version. Rather than sending the bill to a conference committee, Sheppard asked the Senate to pass the bill unanimously without reading the bill or the amendments. The bill passed the Senate unanimously.  The Morris Sheppard Credit Union in Texarkana, Texas carries the Senator's name, while the institution's local credit union chapter is named after Congressman Patman.

Personal life

On December 1, 1909, Sheppard married Lucile Sanderson. The couple had three daughters: Susan, Lucile, and Janet. Some of their descendants also became politicians.

Sheppard and his wife were the grandparents of Connie Mack III, Republican U.S. Representative and U.S. Senator from Florida, and great-grandparents of Connie Mack IV, Republican U.S. Representative from Florida. Other Sheppard grandsons were Democrat Richard Sheppard Arnold (1936–2004) and Republican Morris Sheppard "Buzz" Arnold (born 1941), judges at different times on the United States District Court for the Western District of Arkansas, and later concurrently on the United States Court of Appeals for the Eighth Circuit, the only brothers to serve concurrently on a US federal court of appeals. The federal courthouse in Little Rock is named in Judge Richard Arnold's honor. Judge Morris Arnold, a Republican, remains on the United States Court of Appeals for the Eighth Circuit under senior status.

Death
Sheppard died in office of a brain hemorrhage on April 9, 1941. He is interred at Hillcrest Cemetery in Texarkana, Texas. Andrew Jackson Houston was appointed senator in his place until a special election could be held.

The year following Sheppard's death, his widow Lucile Sanderson Sheppard married Tom Connally, also a United States senator from Texas.  Senator Connally also pre-deceased Lucile.  When she died in 1980, she was buried with her first husband Morris Sheppard in Hillcrest Cemetery.

Legacy

Sheppard Air Force Base in Wichita Falls, Texas was named in his honor.

Fraternal memberships

Freemasons
Knights of Pythias
Odd Fellows
Woodmen of the World
Improved Order of Red Men
Benevolent and Protective Order of Elks
Kappa Alpha Order
Phi Beta Kappa Society

See also
 List of United States Congress members who died in office (1900–49)
 List of United States senators from Texas

References

External links

|-

|-

|-

|-

|-

|-

|-

|-

|-

|-

1875 births
1941 deaths
Activists from Texas
American temperance activists
Democratic Party members of the United States House of Representatives from Texas
Democratic Party United States senators from Texas
People from Morris County, Texas
University of Texas School of Law alumni
Yale University alumni
American segregationists
American white supremacists
Progressivism in the United States